Handball  at the 2022 European Youth Summer Olympic Festival will be held at the Handball Hall Detva in Detva, Slovakia and Handball Hall Zvolen in Zvolen, Slovakia from 25 to 30 July 2022.

Medalists

References

European Youth Summer Olympic Festival
2022 European Youth Summer Olympic Festival
Handball in Slovakia
2022